Jeisson Andrés Vargas Salazar (born 15 September 1997) is a Chilean professional footballer who plays as a forward for Qatari club Al-Rayyan on loan from Universidad de Chile.

Club career
Vargas made his debut at UC playing the last 15 minutes against Universidad de Concepcion in San Carlos de Apoquindo in 2014.

In January 2018, Vargas signed with Montreal Impact in MLS.

In 2023, he joined Qatari club Al-Rayyan on loan from Universidad de Chile on a deal for six months.

International career
Along with Chile U20, he won the L'Alcúdia Tournament in 2015.

Vargas was named in Chile's provisional squad for Copa América Centenario but was cut from the final squad.

Honours
Universidad Católica
 Primera División de Chile (2): Torneo Clausura 2015–16, 2019
 Supercopa de Chile (1): 2019

Chile U20
 L'Alcúdia International Tournament (1): 2015

References

External links

1997 births
Living people
Footballers from Santiago
Chilean footballers
Chile under-20 international footballers
Chilean expatriate footballers
Club Deportivo Universidad Católica footballers
CF Montréal players
Estudiantes de La Plata footballers
Unión La Calera footballers
Universidad de Chile footballers
Al-Rayyan SC players
Chilean Primera División players
Argentine Primera División players
Major League Soccer players
Qatar Stars League players
Chilean expatriate sportspeople in Argentina
Chilean expatriate sportspeople in Canada
Chilean expatriate sportspeople in the United States 
Chilean expatriate sportspeople in Qatar
Expatriate footballers in Argentina
Expatriate soccer players in Canada
Expatriate soccer players in the United States
Expatriate footballers in Qatar
Association football forwards
People from Santiago Province, Chile